The 1893-94 Arsenal FC season was their 8 ever season.

Players

Results

Football League Second Division

Final League table

FA Cup

References

1893-94
English football clubs 1893–94 season